Araly is a town in Northern Jaffna District, Sri Lanka. It is located 8.6 km (5.34 mi) North West from the city of Jaffna.

Schools

Temples 
 Araly Avarampitti Sri Muththumari Amman Kovil
 Kalavathurai Vairavar Kovil
 Araly Ahayakulam Vinayagar Aalayam
 Araly Vannapuram Sivan Kovil
 Araly North Mailiyatpuram Kanthaswamy Kovil
 Araly North Gnana vyravar temple
 Araly North Muruka moorthy temple

Sports clubs 
There are number of sports clubs in Araly. Some of them are listed below. These clubs mainly have football teams. Araly Mawathai Sports club conducts  Uzhavar Vizha (Famers' Festival) on Thai Pongal day. It is a highlight event of Araly.
 Araly Mawathai Sports Club
 Araly Bharathi Sports Club(1959)
 Araly Silverstars Sports Club
 Araly Anna Sports Club
 Araly Kalavaththurai Sports Club
 Araly Kalaivani Sports Club
 Araly A.L. Sports Club
 Araly Nilaveli Sports Club

References

External links 
 Village website http://araly.org
 Araly Saraswathy Maha Vidyalayam

Towns in Jaffna District
Valikamam West DS Division